Survivors is a Russian science fiction television series directed by Andrei Proshkin, which premiered in the summer of 2021.

Plot 
The series takes place in a small Russian town where a deadly virus appears. Most of the inhabitants die, only a few people remain alive, who are affected by sleeping sickness: people cannot wake up on their own, and after two hours of sleep they fall into a coma.

Cast
 Artur Smolyaninov as Sergey Shadrin
 Aleksey Filimonov  as Alexander Morozov
 Darya Savelyeva as Nastya
 Anna Slyu as  Dr. Marina Lavrova
 Vitalia Kornienko as Liza
 Aleksey Rozin as  Rotny 
 Darya Ekamasova as Dina
 Rosa Khairullina as Reverend
 Filipp Avdeyev as Viktor
 Natalia Bardo as Lena

References

External links 
 

2020s Russian television series
2020 Russian television series debuts
Russian drama television series
Russian-language television shows
Television series about viral outbreaks